The Awful Truth is a 1929 American pre-Code romantic comedy film directed by Marshall Neilan and starring Ina Claire and Henry Daniell. It was distributed by Pathé Exchange. The screenplay was written by Horace Jackson and Arthur Richman, based on a play by Richman. Ina Claire starred in the original stage version on Broadway in 1922. The film is now considered lost.

Plot summary

Cast
 Ina Claire as Lucy Warriner
 Henry Daniell as Jerry Warriner
 Theodore von Eltz as Edgar Trent
 Paul Harvey as Dan Leeson
 Blanche Friderici as Mrs. Leeson
 Judith Vosselli as Josephine Trent
 John Roche as Jimmy Kempster

Other versions
There were two other film versions of the play on which the 1929 film was based: the 1925 silent version The Awful Truth with Agnes Ayres and Warner Baxter; and the 1937 film The Awful Truth starring Irene Dunne and Cary Grant. The play was also remade unsuccessfully in color as the musical Let's Do It Again (1953), starring Jane Wyman and Ray Milland.

References

External links
 
 
 
 

1929 films
1929 romantic comedy films
American romantic comedy films
American black-and-white films
Comedy of remarriage films
1920s English-language films
American films based on plays
American independent films
Lost American films
Pathé Exchange films
Remakes of American films
Sound film remakes of silent films
1920s independent films
1929 lost films
Lost romantic comedy films
Films directed by Marshall Neilan
1920s American films
Silent romantic comedy films